Mount Ossa may refer to:

 Mount Ossa (Greece), a mountain in Greece also known as Kissavos
 Mount Ossa (Tasmania), a mountain in Tasmania
 Mount Ossa, Queensland, a mountain in Queensland
 Mount Ossa National Park, a park in Queensland

See also
 Ossa Mountain, a summit in British Columbia, Canada